Thomas Pickard may refer to:

 Thomas Pickard (footballer) (1911–1967), English footballer
 Thomas J. Pickard (born 1950), former FBI director
 Thomas Pickard (politician) (1819–1895), college teacher and politician in New Brunswick, Canada
 Tom Pickard (born 1946), poet and filmmaker
 K. Thomas Pickard (born 1963), American healthcare entrepreneur